Nicolas Marx (born 26 February 1974) is a French former professional footballer who played as a left winger. He spent his entire career at Nîmes.

Personal life 
Following his football career, Marx started to manage a brasserie. In 2015, it was revealed that he had gone traveling around the world.

Honours 
Nîmes

 Championnat National 1: 1996–97
 Coupe de France runner-up: 1995–96

Notes

References

External links 

 
 

1974 births
Living people
Sportspeople from Avignon
French footballers
Association football wingers
Nîmes Olympique players
Ligue 1 players
Ligue 2 players
Championnat National players
Footballers from Provence-Alpes-Côte d'Azur